Camuy is a town and municipality of Puerto Rico, bordering the Atlantic Ocean, north of Lares and San Sebastián; east of Quebradillas; and west of Hatillo. Camuy is spread over 12 barrios and Camuy Pueblo (the downtown area and the administrative center of the city). The town celebrated its 200th anniversary in 2007.

Camuy is part of the "Porta Atlántico" Tourist Area.

History
Camuy, popularly known as Romantic City (la ciudad romántica), was founded in 1807 by Petronila Matos, and formerly part of Arecibo is located in the northwestern coastal region of Puerto Rico, less than 5 minutes west of Hatillo municipality, on PR-2 and PR-119. As early as 1846, a bridge over the Camuy River linked Camuy with Hatillo. The name Camuy derives from the Taíno language, although a number of legends give differing explanations for the origin of the name. One such legend claims the name comes from the Taíno word for "sun", another claims derivation from camuy, Taíno for "beautiful scenery", and still another states that Camuy was the name of the Taíno chief Yumac with the letters in reverse order. The "sun" legend is reflected in the coat of arms for the municipality.

Puerto Rico was ceded by Spain in the aftermath of the Spanish–American War and became a territory of the United States. In 1899, the United States Department of War conducted a census of Puerto Rico finding that the population of Camuy was 10,887.

In its beginnings Camuy was integrated into the Partition of San Antonio de la Tuna. The "partitions" were great expanses of land that divided Puerto Rico. This region today is known as Isabela, Puerto Rico. At the time the partition covered the areas between Aguadilla and Arecibo, what is known today as the municipalities of Camuy, Hatillo, Quebradillas, Isabela, Utuado, and San Sebastián.

The municipality is part of the San Juan-Caguas-Guaynabo metropolitan area and is a popular suburb. It was named in 2015 by the U.S. Conference of Mayors as one of the most livable cities in the United States.

Hurricane Maria on September 20, 2017 triggered numerous landslides in Camuy with the significant amount of rainfall. Electricity was restored to the town center on October 4. However, rural areas remained without electricity until March 2018. There were catastrophic damages in Camuy with around 2000 residences damaged or completely destroyed. The hospital's roof was torn off. The 40 animal husbandry businesses in Camuy, agriculture, and tourism industries suffered heavy losses. One of the main tourist attractions in Puerto Rico located in Camuy, Parque Nacional de las Cavernas del Río Camuy was destroyed, and would remain closed for four years.

Geography

Camuy belongs to the zone designated as the plateau of the northwest where the terrain is level and known as the Valley of Quebradillas. It is located in the Northern Karst zone of Puerto Rico. In the interior of the municipality the topography becomes very irregular near Cibao. This strip of land, a zone of wooded hills and depressions, divides Camuy completely into two strips, north and south. The northern strip is known as Lomas de los Puertos.

The Camuy River forms part of the hydrographic system with a length of 24 miles, which at one point becomes a narrow canyon that forms one of the most beautiful cave systems in the world: the Rio Camuy Caverns, first explored in 1958. The Camuy River along with the Caverns are the 3rd largest and longest underground system in the world and the river is one of the few remaining active underground rivers in the Americas, stretching for miles. The Cibao River also forms part of the system.

Barrios
Like all municipalities of Puerto Rico, Camuy is subdivided into barrios.

Abra Honda
Camuy barrio-pueblo
Camuy Arriba
Cibao
Ciénagas
Membrillo
Piedra Gorda
Puente
Puertos
Quebrada
Santiago
Yeguada
Zanja

Sectors
Barrios (which are like minor civil divisions) and subbarrios, in turn, are further subdivided into smaller local populated place areas/units called sectores (sectors in English). The types of sectores may vary, from normally sector to urbanización to reparto to barriada to residencial, among others.

Special Communities

 (Special Communities of Puerto Rico) are marginalized communities whose citizens are experiencing a certain amount of social exclusion. A map shows these communities occur in nearly every municipality of the commonwealth.

Demographics

Tourism
Camuy is known for its Parque de las Cavernas del Río Camuy (Camuy River Cave Park), a large network of natural limestone caves and underground waterways shared with nearby municipalities of Hatillo and Lares. The cave system was first documented in the 1973 book Discovery At The Rio Camuy by Russell and Jeanne Gurnee. The park built around the cave system features tours of some of the caves, and is one of the most popular natural attractions in Puerto Rico. The caverns were created by the Río Camuy (Camuy River), the third longest underground river in the world. In recognition of this, the Camuy coat of arms includes a symbol for the underground river.

Landmarks and places of interest
There are 9 beaches in Camuy, including .

Other places of interest of Camuy include:
Hacienda Morell
Peñon Brusi Beach
Peñon Amador Beach (Home of the Flamingo)
Rio Camuy Cave Park
Paseo Tablado del Río Camuy (Boardwalk)
Ernesto Memorial Chapel
Camuy History Museum

To stimulate local tourism during the COVID-19 pandemic in Puerto Rico, the Puerto Rico Tourism Company launched the Voy Turistiendo (I'm Touring) campaign in 2021. The campaign featured a passport book with a page for each municipality.

Culture

Religion

Camuy is first and foremost Catholic but there are other religions present in the town, including Protestant denominations such as the Pentecostals, Presbyterians, Methodists, and others. There are four Roman Catholic parishes in Camuy:
The San Jose Parish named after the patron of the town and located in the town square
The Miraculous Medal (also known as "El Calvario") in Piedra Gorda 
The Assumption of Mary located in Quebrada
Our Lady of Montserrate located at Soller near the municipality of Quebradillas

Sports
The town has many local sports teams (volleyball, basketball, martial arts, swimming etc.) but most notably are their baseball teams. Many of them are part of the little league and the intermediate system but at the top the two professional Class A and Double AA baseball teams called "Los Arenosos" (Referring to the abundance of sand from the coastline).

Festivals and Events
The patron saint of Camuy is Saint Joseph. His day is celebrated on March 1. The patron saint festivities (Fiestas Patronales) are celebrated every year around the last 2 weeks of the month of March, the month of Saint Joseph. His official liturgical day is March 1. Other festivals and celebrations that take place in Camuy include:
Velorio Tres Reyes Magos or Three Kings Celebration - January
Mondongazo Festival - February
Camuy Carnival - February
Balseada del Río Camuy and 5k Race - March
Patron Festivities San José - March
"Reviving Our Traditions Festival" -June
Peñon Brussi Beach Festival - July
Municipal Cultural Fair - November

Economy

Agriculture

Agriculture (sugarcane some time ago) and cattle and milk production.

Business
There's an active manufacturing industry in the city, including companies such as Alaska based Cazador Apparel, Seamless Textiles, Hanes, Best Quality Coop and Camuy Furniture Warehouse. SNC Technical Services is another textile manufacturer in Camuy which picked up production in 2019.

In terms of commercial development, several fast foods franchises, banks and stores can be found in Camuy. Two strip malls are also planned to be constructed in the city.

Tourism plays an important role in Camuy's economy due in part to the Rio Camuy Caves, and Camuy's public beaches.

Government

All municipalities in Puerto Rico are administered by a mayor, elected every four years. The current mayor of Camuy is Gabriel Hernández Rodríguez, of the New Progressive Party (PNP).

The city belongs to the Puerto Rico Senatorial district III, which is represented by two Senators. In 2008, José Emilio González Velázquez and Angel Martínez Santiago were elected as District Senators.

Transportation
In 2019, there were 4 bridges in Camuy.

Symbols
The  has an official flag and coat of arms.

Flag
The flag is green like the coat of arms. A white undulating band runs horizontally across and is interrupted in the middle by the figure of the Camuy sun, in this case represented by the colors yellow and black.

Coat of arms
The silver-waving stripe symbolizes the Camuy River (interrupted in the center because the river goes underground for part of its trajectory). The three tower crown distinguishes Camuy as a municipality.

Education
Camuy currently has 17 public schools and a community college.

Gallery

See also

List of Puerto Ricans
History of Puerto Rico

References

Further reading
Discovery at the Rio Camuy (amazon link) by Russell & Jeanne Gurnee
El Solar Morell de Camuy: Sus Ascendientes y Descendientes (amazon link) by P.A. Morell Muñoz

External links
 Camuy and its barrios, United States Census Bureau, 2000
 Camuy - su historia y su gente

 
Municipalities of Puerto Rico
Populated coastal places in Puerto Rico
San Juan–Caguas–Guaynabo metropolitan area
Populated places established in 1807
1807 establishments in Puerto Rico